"Save Me" is a song recorded by Canadian country music artist Tara Lyn Hart. It was released in 2000 as the third single from her debut album, Tara Lyn Hart. It peaked at number 5 on the RPM Country Tracks chart in April 2000. In 2001 the song was named by SOCAN as one of the most performed Canadian country songs.

Chart performance

References

1999 songs
2000 singles
Tara Lyn Hart songs
Epic Records singles
Song recordings produced by Josh Leo